Mersey-class lifeboats are all-weather lifeboats operated by the Royal National Lifeboat Institution (RNLI) from stations around the coasts of Great Britain and Ireland.

The class name comes from the River Mersey which flows into the Irish Sea in north west England.

History
The first of these were only able to be kept afloat as their propellers would be damaged if launched using a slipway or carriage. In 1982 the steel-hulled  came into service which could be launched down a slipway but weighed 25 tons so was not suitable for being moved across a beach on a carriage. The answer was to build a smaller boat with an aluminium hull, which became the Mersey Class.

The first, unnamed, Mersey was built in 1986 and undertook trials during 1987 and 1988. It was then taken out of service and sold the following year. It was working as a trip boat in Westport, County Mayo in 2008 carrying the name Spirit. Two more boats were built in 1988, with the first one to take up active service going to Bridlington Lifeboat Station the following year.

In 1989 12-11 Lifetime Care was built with a fibre-reinforced composite (FRC) hull. Boats built in 1990 continued to use aluminium but from 1991 FRC became the standard hull material.

In 2014, the first of the replacement  boats replaced Merseys at Dungeness, Exmouth and Hoylake. The RNLI intended to have 25 knot lifeboats at all offshore lifeboat stations by the end of 2019. However, this target will not be met as 12 Merseys will still be in service at the end of 2019 with production of Shannons running at six boats per year.

Description
The Mersey is designed to be launched from a carriage, but can also lie afloat or be slipway launched when required. Its propellers are fully protected from damage when launching or in shallow water by partial tunnels and two bilge keels. Its low height can be further reduced by collapsing its mast and aerials which then allows it to be stored in a boathouse. A sealed cabin gives it a self-righting ability.

Power comes from two Caterpillar 285 hp turbo-charged engines. It has a crew of six and can carry an X Boat inflatable which it can deploy at sea. Its survivor compartment can carry 43 people, but more than 21 prevents self-righting should the boat capsize.

Fleet

References

External links 

 RNLI Fleet: Mersey Class